Giovanni Antonaglia OAM (born 19 November 1938) is an Italian-born Australian businessman, supporter of community organisations and winner of the Medal of the Order of Australia.

Early life
Antonaglia was born in Castel San Lorenzo to Italian parents on 19 November 1938.

Career
Giovanni Antonaglia owned a bottle top factory at the age of 18 and has worked for himself since. The Lutwyche resident said his brother coaxed him to move from Italy to Australia in 1967. Mr Antonaglia set up Giovanni Imports 30 years ago, opening a string of shops along the way and donating to more than 75 charities, schools and organisations, one of the main one of these are Operations Smile.

He has been the Proprietor of Giovanni Imports Pty Ltd, Crown Family Jewellers and Maria's Fine Gifts and Jewellery for over 30 years. He is a Member of the Jewellers Association of Australia. He is a supporter through his business of a range of Italian community organisations including the Italian Committee for Social Welfare (CO.AS.IT), Casa Italia and the Italian Catholic Federation. He has been a sponsor of Operation Smile, Australia, since 2001.

Medal of the Order of Australia
Antonaglia was awarded the Medal of the Order of Australia on 9 June 2008 for service to the Italian community of Brisbane, particularly as a supporter of a range of charitable, social welfare, cultural and religious organisations.

Personal life 
Antonaglia currently lives in the Brisbane suburb of Lutwyche with his wife, Maria Antonaglia.

References

20th-century Australian businesspeople
21st-century Australian businesspeople
Living people
Recipients of the Medal of the Order of Australia
1938 births
Australian jewellers
Italian emigrants to Australia